Kether Donohue is an American actress. She is known for her role as Lindsay on You're the Worst, as a cappella leader Alice in Pitch Perfect, and as the exocomp Peanut Hamper on Star Trek: Lower Decks.

Early life
Donohue grew up on the Lower East Side neighborhood of Manhattan, New York City, and went to a performing arts high school.

Donohue studied at the Anthony Meindl Acting Center. In 2008, she graduated from Fordham University where she was a communication and media studies major with a concentration in film.

Career
Donohue is known for the voices of Lily on Kappa Mikey, Kiki Benjamin on Mew Mew Power, Angela Rains on Yu-Gi-Oh! 5D's, and Zoe and Chomp on Dinosaur King. Donohue was also featured in the video for "Coder Girl" by Dale Chase.

In January 2016, Donohue appeared in the role of Jan in the Fox presentation of Grease Live.

She received a Critics' Choice Television Award nomination in December 2015 for Best Supporting Actress in a Comedy Series for her role in the FX/FXX series You're the Worst.

Personal life
Donohue's first name came from an angel name book, and means “Crown" in Hebrew.

Filmography

Film
 2007: Over the GW – Sofia Serra
 2009: New York Lately – Pam
 2009: An Old Hope – Brenda Applegate
 2009: Aaron Bacon – Carrie Bacon
 2010: Boy Wonder – Lizzy
 2012: Altered States of Plaine – Violet
 2012: The Bay – Donna Thompson
 2012: Pitch Perfect – Alice
 2015: Pitch Perfect 2 – Legacy Bella
 2016: Collar – Debbie
 2016: Opening Night – Eileen

Television
 2005: Hope & Faith – Madison Melville
 2008: Late Night with Conan O'Brien – Pregnant Intern
 2009: Royal Pains – Ali
 2012: Ringer – Waitress
 2012: The Mindy Project – Restaurant's Maitre D
 2013: High Maintenance – Annie
 2014–2019: You're the Worst – Lindsay Jillian
 2016: Grease Live – Jan
 2018: LA to Vegas – Meghan*
 2018: Champions – Denise
 2018: The Guest Book – Tara
 2019: You – Tina
 2020: Royalties – Sara
 2020: B Positive – Gabby

Voice roles
 1997: The King of Braves GaoGaiGar – Reiko Komori
 1999: Magical Doremi – Mirabelle Haywood
 2002: Piano: The Melody of a Young Girl's Heart – Shinohara
 2002: The Boy Who Wanted To Be A Bear – Young She-Bear
 2002: Mew Mew Power – Kiki Benjamin
 2004: Midori Days – Midori Kusagano
 2004: Munto 2 – Arine, Suzume Imamura
 2005: Negadon: The Monster from Mars – Emi Narisaki
 2005–2006: Ah! My Goddess – Skuld
 2006–2008: Kappa Mikey – Lily, Ethel
 2006: Ellen's Acres – Ms. Flomens, Mrs. MacStinger, Mrs. Steele, Lydia Galentine
 2006: Yu-Gi-Oh! Capsule Monsters - Young pigtailed African-American girl (in the episode "Eye of the Storm")
 2006: Winx Club (4Kids dub) - Hecate, Tressa
 2007: Dinosaur King – Zoe Drake, Chomp
 2007: Let's Go! Tamagotchi – Makiko
 2008: Joe vs. Joe – Yu
 2008: GoGoRiki – Rosariki, additional voices
 2008–2009: Three Delivery – Eunice
 2009: Kurokami the Animation – Makana
 2009-2010: Pokémon: Diamond and Pearl - Candice, additional voices 
 2009–2011: Yu-Gi-Oh! 5D's – Angela Rains
 2010: Hareport - Cookie, Crow Sister #1, additional voices
 2010: Slayers Evolution-R – Yappi
 2016–2017: All Hail King Julien - Brosalind, April
 2017: Sunny Day – Mandy
 2019: American Dad! – Chloe, Trench Woman
 2019–2020: Elena of Avalor – Flo
 2020–2022: Star Trek: Lower Decks – Ensign Peanut Hamper
 2021: Robot Chicken - Sarah Connor, Party Store Vendor
 2021–present: Tuca & Bertie – additional voices
 2021–present: Birdgirl'' – Gillian

References

External links
 Official website (Archive copy)
 
 

Living people
Actresses from New York City
American film actresses
American television actresses
American voice actresses
Fordham University alumni
21st-century American actresses
Year of birth missing (living people)